Vandalur Reserve Forest is a protected area located in the suburb of Vandalur in the southwestern part of Chennai, about 30 km from the city centre. It is bordered by the Grand Southern Trunk (GST) Road in the west and Suddhanandha Bharathi Street on the northern and the eastern sides, and is intersected by the Vandalur–Kelambakkam Road on the southern side. The reserve forest contains Arignar Anna Zoological Park, the largest zoological garden in the Indian Subcontinent.

History
In 1976, a portion of the reserve forest covering  was demarcated by the Tamil Nadu Forest Department as the new location for the Madras Zoo, initially located in Park Town. Work started in 1979 at an initial cost of  75 million, and the zoo was opened to public on 24 July 1985 as the Arignar Anna Zoological Park.

See also
 Arignar Anna Zoological Park
 Nanmangalam Reserve Forest

References

Geography of Chennai
Protected areas of Tamil Nadu
Reserved forests of India
Protected areas with year of establishment missing